The Eastern Arabic numerals, also called Arabic-Indic numerals or Indo–Arabic numerals, are the symbols used to represent numerical digits in conjunction with the Arabic alphabet in the countries of the Mashriq (the east of the Arab world), the Arabian Peninsula, and its variant in other countries that use the Persian numerals on the Iranian plateau and in Asia.

Origin  
The numeral system originates from an ancient Indian numeral system, which was re-introduced during the Islamic Golden Age in the book On the Calculation with Hindic Numerals written by the Persian mathematician and engineer al-Khwarizmi, whose name was Latinized as Algoritmi.

Other names 
They are sometimes also called Indic numerals or Arabic-Indic numerals in English. However, that is sometimes discouraged as it can lead to confusion with Indian numerals, used in Brahmic scripts of the Indian subcontinent.

Numerals 

Each numeral in the Persian variant has a different Unicode point even if it looks identical to the Eastern Arabic numeral counterpart. However, the variants used with Urdu, Sindhi, and other Languages of South Asia are not encoded separately from the Persian variants.

Written numerals are arranged with their lowest-value digit to the right, with higher value positions added to the left. That is identical to the arrangement used for Western Arabic numerals, even though Arabic script is read from right-to-left. Columns of numbers are usually arranged with the decimal points aligned.

Negative signs are written to the right of magnitudes, e.g.  (−3).

In-line fractions are written with the numerator and denominator on the left and right of the fraction slash respectively, e.g. .

The normal comma  or the symbol   is used as the decimal mark, as in  (3.14159265358).

The Arabic comma  or the symbol  may be used as a thousands separator, e.g.  (1,000,000,000).

Contemporary use 

Eastern Arabic numerals are in predominant use over Western Arabic numerals in many countries to the east of the Arab world, notably Iran and Afghanistan.

In Arabic-speaking Asia, as well as Egypt and Sudan, both types of numerals are in use (and are often employed alongside each other), though Western Arabic numerals are increasingly used, including in Saudi Arabia. The United Arab Emirates uses both Eastern and Western Arabic numerals.

In Pakistan, Western Arabic numerals are more extensively used digitally. Eastern numerals continue to see use in Urdu publications and newspapers, as well as signboards. 

In the Maghreb, only Western Arabic numerals are now commonly used. In medieval times, these areas used a slightly different set (from which, via Italy, Western Arabic numerals derive).

The Thaana writing system used for the Maldivian language adopted its first nine letters (haa, shaviyani, noonu, raa, baa, lhaviyani, kaafu, alifu, and vaavu) from Perso-Arabic digits. The next nine letters are from the local Dhives Akuru digits (old system with the letter dnaviyani between gaafu and seenu). The next few letters are derived from secondary modifications to some of the previous letters.

See also
Arabic numerals
Abjad numerals

Notes

References

Numerals